Budapesti Honvéd SE is a basketball club based in Budapest, Hungary. With 33 Hungarian Championships and 17 Hungarian Cups won from the 1950s to the 1990s, it is the most successful team in the Hungarian national basketball league. The club was relegated from the 1st division in 2001, but continued as an amateur club in the 3rd division. Between 2004 and 2022 they have played in the 2nd division.

History
The team was founded in 1950. In their first season they finished 3rd (with equal points as the champions, MAFC, and the runner-up, Vasas).  Over the following 18 seasons they won 17 championships (in 1956 they finished unbeaten as runner-up because of the Hungarian Revolution of 1956).

From 1951 to 1960 they lost only one match, going unbeaten from 18 October 1954 to 6 October 1960. Between 1970 and 1975 they won two more championships, but between 1976 and 1986 they dominated again, winning every  championship during this period. 

In the next 6 seasons they finished once as runner-up and twice in 3rd place. In 1992, the third-placed team Budapesti Honvéd merged with the fourth-placed team Tungsram and they once again dominated the championship: in the next five seasons they won four championships (two as Danone Honvéd for sponsorship reasons). 

In 1998 they finished as runner-up as the last Budapest-based club to win a medal in the Hungarian basketball league. In 1999 and 2000 they finished in 10th place. In 2001 they finished 11th in the regular season. 

Subsequently they were relegated in the playout. In the FIBA European Champions Cup they finished 3rd in 1958 and played in the quarter-finals in 1958–59. Thereafter they were less successful. Five Honvéd-players were on the runner-up national team in the EuroBasket 1953 and on the winning team in the EuroBasket 1955.

Honors
Hungarian Championship: 33
Winners: 1952, 1953, 1954, 1955, 1957, 1957–58, 1958–59, 1959–60, 1960–61, 1961–62, 1962–63, 1964, 1965, 1966, 1967, 1968, 1969, 1971, 1974, 1976, 1977, 1978, 1979, 1980–81, 1981–82, 1982–83, 1983–84, 1984–85, 1985–86, 1992–93, 1993–94, 1994–95, 1996–97.
Runners-up: 1956, 1970, 1972, 1975, 1986–87, 1995–96, 1997–98.
3rd place: 1951, 1988–89, 1991–92.
Hungarian Cup: 17
Winners:  1953, 1954, 1955, 1962, 1963, 1964, 1966, 1967, 1968, 1973, 1977, 1978, 1982, 1983, 1986, 1989, 1991.
Runners-up: 1965, 1970, 1972, 1975, 1976, 1985, 1990, 1996, 1997.
3rd place: 1952, 1969, 1974, 1979, 1984, 1988, 1992, 1995.

Current players

Notable players

 Tibor Remai
 János Simon
 János Greminger
 Tibor Czinkán
 László Hódi
 Kornél Dávid
 Márton Báder
 Tómas Holton

External links
 
 Fibaeurope.com, 1991–93
 Fibaeurope.com, 1993–99

Basketball teams in Hungary
Basketball teams established in 1950
Sport in Budapest
1950 establishments in Hungary